Nataliia Lupu (born 4 November 1987 in Marshyntsi) is a Ukrainian who specializes in 800 metres.

Career
She finished fourth at the 2006 World Junior Championships. She competed at the 2009 European Indoor Championships, the 2009 World Championships and the 2010 World Indoor Championships.

At the 2014 World Indoor Championships, she tested positive for the use of a prohibited stimulant, methylhexaneamine, receiving a 9-month ban. The ban lasted from 7 March 2014 to 21 January 2015.

In May 2017, she was disqualified for 8 years until 26 December 2024.

Achievements

Personal bests

References

1987 births
Living people
Ukrainian female middle-distance runners
Olympic athletes of Ukraine
Athletes (track and field) at the 2012 Summer Olympics
Athletes (track and field) at the 2016 Summer Olympics
Ukrainian people of Romanian descent
Doping cases in athletics
Ukrainian sportspeople in doping cases
World Athletics Championships athletes for Ukraine
Sportspeople from Chernivtsi Oblast
20th-century Ukrainian women
21st-century Ukrainian women